Sacha Zegueur (born 21 June 1999) is a French rugby union player, who currently plays as a flanker for Top 14 club Pau.

Early life
He began playing rugby for his hometown club in 2010.

Club career
On 31 August 2018, Zegueur made his professional debut for Oyonnax against Colomiers.
 
In October 2021, it was announced by multiple media sources that he will leave his club and join Pau at the end of the 2021–22 Pro D2 season. On 9 June 2022, the move was finally made official.

On 24 September, he played his first game for his new club and started as a blinside flanker under his former France U20 coach Sébastien Piqueronies.

International career
In 2018, Zegueur won the Six Nations Under 20s Championship with France U20. A few months later, he was selected for the World Rugby Under 20 Championship and won the competition. He then won a back-to-back championship the year after.

On 22 November 2020, he received his first call-up to the France senior team for the Autumn Nations Cup after a Yacouba Camara's injury but he remained uncapped.

On 12 March 2023, he was called back to the national team for the 2023 Six Nations Championship game against England.

Honours

France U20
 World Rugby Under 20 Championship: 2018, 2019
 Six Nations Under 20s Championship: 2018

References

External links
 Section Paloise
 EPCR
 All.Rugby
 It's Rugby 

Living people
1999 births
French rugby union players  
Rugby union flankers
Section Paloise players
Oyonnax Rugby players